Gukhoe-daero is an eight-lane highway located in Seoul, South Korea. The route is a part of Seoul City Route 46 and Seoul City Route 49.

History
This route was established on 15 September 1986.서울특별시공고 제511호, 1986년 9월 15일.

Stopovers
 Seoul
 Yangcheon District - Gangseo District - Yeongdeungpo District - Mapo District

List of Facilities 
IS: Intersection, IC: Interchange

 (■): Motorway section

References

1986 establishments in South Korea
Roads in Seoul